The Ḥabīb al-siyar fī akhbār afrād al-bashar ("The beloved of careers reporting on the multitudes of people") is a universal history by the Persian historian Khvandamir (died 	1535/6).

References

Sources

Further reading 
 
 
 
 
 
 
 

History books about Islam
History books about Iran
16th-century books
Persian-language literature
History books about India